The Cyprus Rally is a rallying competition held yearly in Cyprus since 1970. The event is run by the Cyprus Automobile Association and is based in the city of Limassol (Lemesos). It is run on the winding roads of the nearby mountains of Troödos. It was part of the FIA's World Rally Championship (WRC) from 2000 to 2006. In 2007 and 2008 the event was part of the FIA Middle East Rally Championship (MERC). The Cyprus Rally rejoined the WRC in 2009, taking advantage of the new regulations to become the only mixed surface event.

Between 2010 and 2012, the event was the final round of the Intercontinental Rally Challenge (IRC), as well as the penultimate round of the MERC (except in 2011, when it was separately held in July), including in 2013.

Editions

Notes

References

External links

 Official website
 Photos from Cyprus Rally
 Cyprus Rally at eWRC-results

 
Middle East Rally Championship
Cyprus
Cyprus
Motorsport competitions in Cyprus
Recurring sporting events established in 1983
World Rally Championship rallies